Suid or SUID may refer to:

 Suidae, animals such as pigs
 SUID, sudden and unexpected infant death
In computing:
 setuid, a privilege elevation mechanism 
 Saved user ID, a type of user identifier for processes